Justin Garrett Whalin (born September 6, 1974) is an American former actor and teacher. He is known for his roles as the teenage Andy Barclay in Child's Play 3 and Jimmy Olsen in the American television series Lois & Clark: The New Adventures of Superman.

Early life
Whalin was born in the Sunset District of San Francisco, California. His mother, Terry Villanueva, is a teacher and school administrator who owns and operates two L.A. area schools:  The Learning Castle and La Cañada Preparatory. His father, Craig Whalin, is a real estate appraiser. His parents divorced when he was seven years old and both remarried. He has a younger half-brother and an older stepbrother and stepsister.

He studied acting at the American Conservatory Theater (A.C.T.) in San Francisco, and attended Lowell High School. After years of commuting between Los Angeles and San Francisco, he and his mother eventually relocated to L.A. permanently when he was fifteen years old. He completed his high school education through U.C. Berkeley's homeschooling program.

Career
Whalin is known for his appearances in such films as John Waters' cult classic Serial Mom with Kathleen Turner, Child's Play 3, the Disney Channel's Susie Q, and as the young Daily Planet photographer Jimmy Olsen in the TV series Lois & Clark: The New Adventures of Superman from 1994 to 1997.

Whalin has been working as an actor since the age of eleven, when he debuted in the title role of the play The Little Prince at San Francisco's Victoria Theatre. He starred in the 1993 CBS Schoolbreak Special production Other Mothers for which he won a Daytime Emmy for his portrayal of a son with lesbian parents. He went on to star in Miracle at Midnight opposite Mia Farrow and Sam Waterston. He also auditioned to play Billy Loomis in Scream. Whalin quit acting in 2009 and is now working as a social studies/drama teacher and administrator at The Learning Castle & La Cañada Preparatory, an exclusive school in the Los Angeles area.

Filmography

Film

Television

Awards

References

External links

 
 Film-Reviews.net interview (25 July 2007)

1974 births
American male child actors
American male film actors
American male television actors
Living people
Male actors from San Francisco
20th-century American male actors
21st-century American male actors
American Conservatory Theater alumni